Webster is a city in and the county seat of Day County, South Dakota, United States. The population was 1,728 at the 2020 census.

History
The town was platted in 1880, and was named in honor of J. B. Webster, a pioneer settler.

Geography

Webster has been assigned the ZIP code 57274 and the FIPS place code 69780.

Climate

Demographics

2010 census
At the 2010 census, there were 1,886 people, 878 households and 481 families living in the city. The racial makeup of the city was 95.1% White, 0.2% African American, 2.3% Native American, 0.2% Asian, 0.3% from other races, and 1.9% from two or more races. Hispanic or Latino of any race were 0.7% of the population.

There were 878 households, of which 25.4% had children under the age of 18 living with them, 41.8% were married couples living together, 9.1% had a female householder with no husband present, 3.9% had a male householder with no wife present, and 45.2% were non-families. 41.0% of all households were made up of individuals, and 21% had someone living alone who was 65 years of age or older. The average household size was 2.08 and the average family size was 2.81.

The median age was 46.3 years. 22.9% of residents were under the age of 18; 6.4% were between the ages of 18 and 24; 19.2% were from 25 to 44; 26% were from 45 to 64; and 25.5% were 65 years of age or older. The gender makeup of the city was 47.3% male and 52.7% female.

2000 census
At the 2000 census, there were 1,952 people, 866 households and 512 families living in the city. The population density was 1,308.9 per square mile (505.8/km2). There were 1,023 housing units at an average density of 685.9 per square mile (265.1/km2). The racial makeup of the city was 97.49% White, 1.23% Native American, 0.10% Asian, 0.05% Pacific Islander, 0.05% from other races, and 1.08% from two or more races. Hispanic or Latino of any race were 0.26% of the population.

There were 866 households, of which 25.5% had children under the age of 18 living with them, 48.8% were married couples living together, 6.9% had a female householder with no husband present, and 40.8% were non-families. 37.8% of all households were made up of individuals, and 23.2% had someone living alone who was 65 years of age or older. The average household size was 2.18 and the average family size was 2.86.

23.2% of the population were under the age of 18, 5.6% from 18 to 24, 23.5% from 25 to 44, 20.7% from 45 to 64, and 27.0% who were 65 years of age or older. The median age was 43 years. For every 100 females, there were 87.7 males. For every 100 females age 18 and over, there were 83.8 males.

The median household income was $29,457 and the median family income was $40,982. Males had a median income of $30,121 compared with $18,380 for females. The per capita income was $16,398. Approximately 9.0% of families and 11.3% of the population were below the poverty line, including 11.4% of those under age 18 and 8.5% of those age 65 or over.

Education
Webster public schools are part of the Webster School District (South Dakota). The district has an elementary school, middle school and high school, Webster High School.

Media
Reporter and Farmer is Day County's newspaper.

Notable people

 Sigurd Anderson – Governor of South Dakota, 1951–1954. Webster's airfield is the Sigurd Anderson airport.
 Tom Brokaw – Retired television anchorman for NBC, born in Webster
 Jerry Brudos – Oregon serial killer, born in Webster
 Brock Lesnar – WWE professional wrestler and performer and former mixed martial artist and Heavyweight Champion in the Ultimate Fighting Championship
 Creighton Leland Robertson – Episcopalian bishop and lawyer, practiced law in Webster
 Lee Schoenbeck – lawyer and current President Pro Tempore of the South Dakota State Senate, born in Webster
 William Garner Waddel – South Dakota State Senator, former Mayor of Webster

See also
 List of cities in South Dakota

References

External links

 Webster Area Chamber of Commerce

Cities in Day County, South Dakota
Cities in South Dakota
County seats in South Dakota
Populated places established in 1895
1895 establishments in South Dakota